Roman Vondráček (born September 26, 1984) is a Czech professional ice hockey forward currently playing for Rapaces de Gap of the Ligue Magnus.

Vondrácek played in the Czech Extraliga for HC Sparta Praha, HC Plzeň and HC Kometa Brno. On November 8, 2013, he joined Rapaces de Gap of the Ligue Magnus. On May 10, 2015, he joined Brest Albatros Hockey where he played for one season before moving to Aigles de Nice on June 17, 2016. On December 15, 2018, Vondráček rejoined Rapaces de Gap.

References

External links

1984 births
Living people
HC Berounští Medvědi players
Brest Albatros Hockey players
Czech ice hockey forwards
BK Havlíčkův Brod players
SHK Hodonín players
HC Kometa Brno players
Les Aigles de Nice players
BK Mladá Boleslav players
Orli Znojmo players
People from Trutnov
HC Plzeň players
Rapaces de Gap players
HC Sparta Praha players
Stadion Hradec Králové players
Sportspeople from the Hradec Králové Region
Czech expatriate sportspeople in France
Expatriate ice hockey players in France
Czech expatriate ice hockey people